Michael Kevin Power FBA (born July 1957) is professor of accounting at the London School of Economics. He is a fellow of the British Academy an academic governor of the LSE, and a fellow of the Institute of Chartered Accountants in England and Wales (ICAEW).

Selected publications
 Riskwork: Essays on the Organizational Life of Risk Management (Oxford University Press, 2016) 
 Risk Culture in Financial Organizations: a Research Report. London: Financial Services Knowledge Transfer Network/CARR, 2013. (With Tommaso Palermo, Simon Ashby)
 Organized Uncertainty: Designing a World of Risk Management (Oxford University Press, 2007). Translated into Japanese in 2010.
 Organizational Encounters with Risk (Cambridge: Cambridge University Press, 2005). (with B. Hutter)
 The Risk Management of Everything (London: Demos, 2004) 
 The Audit Society: Rituals of Verification (Oxford: Oxford University Press, 1997; second paperback edition 1999). Translated into Italian (2002), Japanese (2003) and French (2005).

References

Living people
Fellows of the British Academy
Academics of the London School of Economics
British accountants
1957 births
Alumni of St Edmund Hall, Oxford